Quintana is a municipality (município) in the state of São Paulo in Brazil. The population is 6,688 (2020 est.) in an area of 319 km². The elevation is 595 m.

References

Municipalities in São Paulo (state)